"Ludlow Massacre" is a song by Woody Guthrie about the Ludlow Massacre, a labor conflict in Ludlow, Colorado, in 1914.  A related song is the "1913 Massacre".

Woody Guthrie wrote:

Recorded versions
  Woody Guthrie Hard Travelin' Asch Recordings. Vol. 3, Struggle Folkways 1992
  Ramblin' Jack Elliot Woody Guthrie's Blues 1955, and South Coast 1995
  Christy Moore recorded a version of the song in 1972

The song has also been recorded by Arlo Guthrie (with the Dillards); Barbara Dane; Dick Gaughan; Joe Glazer; John McCutcheon; Paul Svenson; Ralph McTell; and Tom Juravich.

References

External links
 Lyrics from the Woody Guthrie Foundation

Trade union songs
Protest songs
Songs based on American history
Woody Guthrie songs
Music of Colorado
Songs written by Woody Guthrie
1944 songs
Songs about Colorado